Cruise lines have opted to increase capacity by stretching their current ships. Known as lengthening, the process of enlarging a cruise ship usually includes cutting the ship in half and adding a new midsection, adding more cabins and public areas. The first modern cruise ship to be stretched was Royal Caribbean Line's Song of Norway in 1977.

External links 

 Balmoral Stretch Time-lapse
 MSC Armonia Stretch
 Silver Spirit Lengthening Video
 Windstar Cruises - How to Stretch a cruise ship

References 

stretched cruise ships